Bagur, also known as Sannakki Baguru is a village located in Hosadurga Taluk, Chitradurga district, Karnataka, India.it is one greater in hosadurga taluk
In This village have a 101 temples .

History
Bagur village has several historical temples (13°49'13"N   76°11'40"E) which are in a state of neglect. It is believed that the village had 101 temples before 20th Century. The village is also known as Sannakki Bagur highlighting the good quality small rice grown in the village with tank water.

Amenities
Bagur village has a post office with pin code 577515. The village has a higher primary school established in 1927 C.E. by Government Departments.

References

Villages in Chitradurga district